Tamir Linhart (born 18 November 1968 in Israel) is a former professional and college soccer player.

Career 
Linhart played professionally for 7 years for Hapoel Tel Aviv of the Israeli Premier League and won two times the National Championships. He was a member of the two-time championship team and qualified with Hapoel Tel Aviv for the UEFA Cup. He also played professionally for the Washington Warthogs of the Continental Indoor Soccer League.

1991 until 1994 Linhart played for George Mason University and was voted twice All American. Linhart was inducted into the Washington Sports Jewish Hall of Fame in 2002, and into the George Mason Soccer Hall of Fame.

Coaching career 
In 1997 Linhart founded the Golden Boot Soccer Academy and works here currently as coach.

References

1968 births
Living people
Israeli footballers
Washington Warthogs players
Continental Indoor Soccer League players
George Mason Patriots men's soccer players
Soccer players from Virginia
People from Netanya
Association football midfielders